Morteza Haji is an Iranian reformist politician. He held office as a governor and minister during the 1980s, 1990s and 2000s.

He was head of Mohammad Khatami's presidential campaign in 1997 and a director of Hassan Rouhani presidential campaign, 2017.

References

Living people
Year of birth missing (living people)
Government ministers of Iran
Islamic Iran Participation Front politicians
Islamic Nations Party members
Iranian governors
Impeached Iranian officials
Iranian campaign managers